George Nelson Richmond (April 18, 1821January 4, 1896) was an American paper manufacturer and Democratic politician.  He served as the 8th and 10th mayor of Appleton, Wisconsin, and 5th mayor of Portage, Wisconsin, and represented Outagamie County for four years in the Wisconsin Legislature.  During the American Civil War, he served as a Union Army cavalry officer.

Background 
Born in Hillsdale, New York, Richmond was the son of Peleg Sisson Richmond and Margaret (Soule) Richmond. He received an academic education and went into the milling business in Sheffield, Massachusetts. He married Sarah Hillyer (1825–1905) on April 30, 1843. He came to Wisconsin in 1850, and settled in Milwaukee for a while before moving to Portage in 1851 where he served six years on the Portage Common Council and two years as mayor. During the American Civil War, Richmond served in the 2nd Wisconsin Cavalry Regiment as a company captain and later as major of the 3rd battalion.  He participated in the captures of Vicksburg and Jackson, Mississippi, and several minor battles in the western theater of the war.

After the Civil War 
In 1865, Richmond moved to Appleton. He was twice elected as a Liberal Democrat/Liberal Reform Party member of the Wisconsin State Assembly from Outagamie County for 1874, and for 1875; served three years as mayor of Appleton, and in 1877 was elected to the Wisconsin State Senate as a Democrat (the Reform Party was dissolving by that point), with 3,658 votes against 1,642 for Greenbacker J. L. Pringle.

He died January 4, 1896, in Tacoma, Washington, and is buried in Tacoma Cemetery.

References

External links
 

1821 births
1896 deaths
Mayors of places in Wisconsin
Papermakers
Politicians from Appleton, Wisconsin
People from Hillsdale, New York
People from Portage, Wisconsin
People of Wisconsin in the American Civil War
Wisconsin city council members
Wisconsin Reformers (19th century)
Democratic Party Wisconsin state senators
Union Army officers
19th-century American politicians
Democratic Party members of the Wisconsin State Assembly